Mathias Döpfner (born 15 January 1963) is a German businessman and journalist. He is the CEO and 22% owner of media group Axel Springer SE, and president of the Federal Association of Digital Publishers and Newspaper Publishers (BDZV).

Early life and education
Döpfner grew up in Offenbach am Main. His mother was a housewife and his father, Dieter C. Döpfner, was a university professor of architecture and director of the Offenbach College of Applied Arts from 1966 to 1970.

Döpfner studied musicology, German literature and theater science in Frankfurt and Boston.

Career

Döpfner began his career in 1982 as the music critic of the Frankfurter Allgemeine Zeitung supplement. After working as the FAZ correspondent in Brussels, Döpfner moved to Gruner + Jahr in 1992 – initially employed by board member Axel Ganz in Paris, later as assistant to the CEO Gerd Schulte-Hillen.

In April 1994, Döpfner became editor-in-chief of the Berlin weekly newspaper Wochenpost. In 1996 he took over the post of editor-in-chief of the Hamburg tabloid Hamburger Morgenpost.

In March 1998, Döpfner became editor-in-chief of Axel Springer SE's national daily newspaper Die Welt. Döpfner became a member of the management board of Axel Springer SE and head of the newspaper division in 2000, and CEO in 2002.

In 2020, Friede Springer designated Döpfner as her successor as she gifted, sold and transferred the right to vote her stake in the business to him. Under the arrangement, she sold a 4.1% stake to Döpfner and gifted 15% more, bringing his direct stake to 22%. She also transferred voting rights for her remaining 22% in the business.

Journalistic and publishing activities
Döpfner regularly speaks out on media and socio-political, economic and cultural issues. Particular attention was given to his debate with Nobel laureate Günter Grass, documented by Der Spiegel (June 2006). Döpfner surprised with the confession: "I am a non-Jewish Zionist". Alongside the topics of threats from Islamic fundamentalism and the image of the United States in Germany, the discussion also focused on the achievements and the failings of the 1968 movement. Döpfner published his opinion on the threat from Islamism in his WELT essay "The West and the mocking laughter of Islamism".

In July 2009, ARD TV broadcast Döpfner's film "My friend George Weidenfeld". Döpfner sees the film portrait, in which he accompanies Lord Weidenfeld on his travels and at meetings and interviews prominent companions such as Daniel Barenboim, Helmut Kohl, Angela Merkel or Shimon Peres, as "a very subjective approach to a great European".

He has repeatedly commented on the subjects of freedom and digitization, particularly in the fall of 2010 as a visiting professor at the University of Cambridge. Under the title "Freedom and the Digital Revolution" Döpfner held three lectures, which addressed Germans' difficult relationship to freedom, the global erosion of freedom and its causes, and digitization as the fourth major cultural revolution and its impact on the freedom of press, privacy, and journalism as well as in his book "Die Freiheitsfalle – The freedom trap" published by Propyläen Verlag in 2011, in which he focuses on the West's growing tiredness of defending freedom. Taking three watershed events as examples – the fall of the Berlin Wall, Nine Eleven and the financial crisis – Döpfner analyzes the triumphs, threats, and excesses of liberal societies and argues that freedom needs to be fought for, defended and answered for daily, and that democratic societies have not been sufficiently resolute in this regard. They risked falling into the freedom trap and either losing freedom through inaction or betraying it by defending with the wrong means. Alongside the power of freedom in politics and business, Döpfner reflects upon the spirit of freedom in music, literature and painting on the basis of three central works by Richard Wagner, Thomas Mann and Gustave Courbet. The book closes with an analysis of the digital world, in which Döpfner emphasizes the ambivalence of the Internet as a platform critical of authority at the same time as being a monitoring tool controlled by authority.

Döpfner's contributions to media policy include keynotes, for example at the NOAH Conference Berlin 2015 or at the SPIEGEL Publishers Forum, the focus of which were the establishment of paid online content and the differentiation between private and public media in digital channels.

For the occasion of the centenary of Axel Springer's birth in 2012, Döpfner gave his personal view of the founder in his New Year's speech. The "Ceremony" in May 2012 was a surprise in itself, as Döpfner converted the entire event into a tongue-in-cheek and entertaining revue without a single speech. He made his own debut as an actor, reciting a fictitious letter to the publisher wearing a hoodie jacket and jeans. The F.A.Z described the revue as an event, in which "pathos, flippancy, understatement and exaggeration, self-righteousness and self-irony were mixed together in a wondrous, sometimes uplifting way, a milestone in the history of the Springer Group."

In an open letter to the executive chairman of Google, Eric Schmidt, he criticized the search engine company, thus triggering a public debate.

In April 2016, Döpfner showed solidarity with German satirist Jan Böhmermann in an open letter. In his show "Neo Magazine Royale", Böhmermann had previously illustrated the difference between satire and insulting criticism with profane a poem about the Turkish President Erdoğan, which led to resentment in the Turkish government as well as a public prosecution in Germany. Erdogan subsequently applied for an injunction against Döpfner in May 2016 at a German Court. The request was rejected in the first and second instance.

In November 2017, Döpfner condemned Kuwait Airlines for barring an Israeli passenger from a flight.

In February 2023 The Economist reported on Döpfner's plans to expand the Springer group's media presence in the United States.

SMS with a statement regarding the Federal Republic of Germany 
In the course of the compliance procedure around Julian Reichelt, Döpfner sent a text message to a writer in March 2021, which referred to the Federal Republic of Germany as a "new, authoritarian GDR-State". New York Times journalist Ben Smith, who revealed the text message, said that it was a right-wing conspiracy theory that saw COVID-19 restrictions as part of an authoritarian conspiracy. After the incident, the US perception of Axel Springer SE could be brought into line with that in Germany, where it is viewed in a way similar to how Fox News is viewed in the US.

In a private video message to Axel Springer employees, Döpfner urged employees to report abuses of power and disrespectful professional interaction, to speak openly, and to "not to be afraid". He criticized The New York Times for publishing a private SMS message. He stated that a private text message was not public speech and was taken out of context.

Other activities
In 2010, Döpfner was visiting professor in media at the University of Cambridge and became a member of St John's College. In addition, he holds a variety of paid and unpaid positions.

Corporate boards
 eMarketer, Member of the Board of Directors (since 2016)
 Insider Inc., Member of the Board of Directors
 Netflix, Member of the Board of Directors (since 2018)
 Ringier Axel Springer Schweiz, Member of the Board of Directors (since 2016)
 Warner Music, Member of the Board of Directors (since 2014)

Non-profit organizations
 American Academy in Berlin, Member of the Board of Trustees
 Alfred Herrhausen Gesellschaft of Deutsche Bank, Member of the Board of Trustees
 Axel Springer Prize, Chairman of the Board of Trustees
 Friends of the Academy of the Arts, Member
 Bilderberg Meetings, Member of Steering Committee
 European Publishers Council, Member
 Federation of German Newspaper Publishers (BDZV), President (since 2016)
 Frank Schirrmacher Foundation, Member of the Board
 Blavatnik School of Government, University of Oxford, Member of the International Advisory Board (since 2010)
 International Journalists’ Programmes (IJP), Member of the Board of Trustees
 Museum Berggruen, Member of the International Council
 Friends of the Prussian Palaces and Gardens Foundation Berlin-Brandenburg, Member
 Robert Koch Foundation, Member of the Board of Trustees

Personal life
Döpfner is married to Ulrike Weiss, the daughter of Ulrich Weiss, a former management board member of Deutsche Bank AG. They have three sons. One of his sons works as the chief of staff to Peter Thiel. He has another son (born 2016) from a relationship with fellow billionaire Julia Stoschek.

Recognition
 2019 Leo Baeck Prize of the Central Council of Jews in Germany
 2019 Janus Korczak Prize for Humanism
 2016 Arno Lustiger Prize
 2015 McCloy Award of the American Council on Germany
 2014 Anti-Defamation League (ADL) International Leadership Award, New York City
 2014 Shepard Stone-Award, Aspen Berlin
 2014 Europe Award of Merit des U.O.B.B.
 2013 European Manager of the Year, European Business Press Association
 2012 Kress Head of the Year
 2012 Strategist of the Year, Financial Times Germany
 2011 German Media Award: Media Person of the Year
 2010 Humanitas Visiting Professor in Media 2010 at the University of Cambridge; Member of St. John's College, Cambridge
 2008 Leadership Award, Global American Institute for Contemporary German Studies New York
 2008 Jerusalem Prize]] of the Zionist Organization in Germany 
 2007 Leo Baeck Medal of the Leo Baeck Institute New York
 2007 1st place in Kress report in the category: "Top 50 media heads – the most important managers from media and communication" 
 2007 Honorary Order of Merit of Berlin
 2000 Appointed Young Global Leader of the World Economic Forum
 1991 Axel-Springer-Preis for Young Journalists

Works
Mathias O. C. Döpfner, Thomas Garms: Neue Deutsche Welle. Kunst oder Mode? Frankfurt am Main; Berlin; Wien: Ullstein, 1984,  (Ullstein-Buch, 36505; Populäre Kultur)
Mathias O. C. Döpfner, Thomas Garms: Erotik in der Musik. Frankfurt/Main; Berlin: Ullstein, 1986,  (Ullstein-Buch, 36517; Populäre Kultur)
Mathias O. C. Döpfner: Musikkritik in Deutschland nach 1945. Inhaltliche und formale Tendenzen; eine kritische Analyse. At the same time: Dissertation, Universität Frankfurt (Main), 1990. Frankfurt am Main; Bern; New York; Paris: Lang, 1991,  (Europäische Hochschulschriften, Reihe 36, Musikwissenschaft vol. 59)
Brüssel. Das Insider-Lexikon. München: Beck, 1993,  (Beck'sche Reihe; 1007)
Axel Springer. Neue Blicke auf den Verleger; eine Edition aktueller Autorenbeiträge und eigener Texte. Editor: Mathias Döpfner. Hamburg: Springer, 2005, 
Reform statt Subvention – Warum wir verlässliche gesetzliche Maßstäbe für Fusionsvorhaben und Schutz kreativer Leistungen brauchen, in: Krautscheid/Schwartmann (editors), Fesseln für die Vielfalt? Das Medienkonzentrationsrecht auf dem Prüfstand, C.F Müller Verlag, Heidelberg 2010
Die Verlage sind im digitalen Zeitalter stärker, als sie selbst denken. In: Hubert Burda, Mathias Döpfner, Bodo Hombach, Jürgen Rüttgers (editors): 2020 – Gedanken zur Zukunft des Internets. Klartext, Essen, 2010, S. 177–182. .
 How German is it? print of the speech at Thomas Demand's exhibition „Nationalgalerie“, Suhrkamp 2010
 Die Freiheitsfalle – Ein Bericht. Berlin: Propyläen, 2011, 256 pages, 
 Anselm Kiefer/Mathias Döpfner, Kunst und Leben, Mythen und Tod. Ein Streitgespräch, Quadriga Verlag, 2012
 Leser- und Kundenorientierung in einer digitalisierten Medienwelt – Eine Zwischenbilanz, in: Stadler/Brenner/Hermann (editors), Erfolg im digitalen Zeitalter, Frankfurter Allgemeine Buch Verlag, 2012
 Essay „Laughter is anti-authoritarian, laughter is freedom“, 12 January 2015
 Die Welt gehört denen, die neu denken. In: Kardinaltugenden effektiver Führung. Drucker, Peter F. (editor), München: Redline Verlag, 2014. 
 „Berlin ist das Herz Europas, ich kenne kein anderes.“: Axel Springer und seine Stadt. Berlin: Edition Braus. .
 Abschied vom Pessimismus. In: Die Idee des Mediums – Reden zur Zukunft des Journalismus / Bernhard Pörksen ; Andreas Narr (editor), von Halem 2015.

References

External links
 Mathias Döpfner on the Charlie Rose Show
 

Living people
1963 births
German male journalists
German journalists
German newspaper journalists
20th-century German journalists
21st-century German journalists
German male writers
Recipients of the Order of Merit of Berlin
Axel Springer SE
Die Welt editors
Warner Bros. Discovery people
Netflix people
Hamburger Morgenpost editors